The Gomionica Monastery is a Serbian Orthodox monastery dedicated to the Presentation of Mary and located at the village of Kmećani, 42 kilometres west of Banja Luka, in the Republika Srpska entity of Bosnia and Herzegovina. The monastery is the spiritual centre of the region known as Zmijanje.

It was founded before 1536, though the exact date of its foundation is unknown. It was referred to as Zalužje in 16th-century sources, while its current name comes from a nearby river. In the second half of the 16th century, the abbot of the monastery was credited by the Ottomans for the peaceful attitude of the population of a wide area around Gomionica.

The monastery may have been abandoned, at least partially, at the end of the 17th century (after the Great Turkish War), and during the 1730s. The church was refurbished several times during the 18th and 19th centuries. Writer Petar Kočić attended the elementary school organised at the monastery. It was badly damaged during World War II, and its abbot, Serafim Štrkić, was murdered in 1941 by the Nazi-affiliated Croatian Ustaše.

After the war, Gomionica became a female monastery. In 1953, it was designated as a cultural monument of Yugoslavia, and in 2006, it was proclaimed a National Monument of Bosnia and Herzegovina. The treasury of Gomionica contains icons created in the 16th to 19th centuries, as well as manuscripts and printed books created in the 14th to 17th centuries. A silver-gilt cross formerly owned by the monastery, made in 1640, is now in the collection of the University of London, which acquired it from the private collection of Thomas Gambier Parry.

References

External links
Official website of the Gomionica Monastery

Serbian Orthodox monasteries in Bosnia and Herzegovina
National Monuments of Bosnia and Herzegovina
16th-century Serbian Orthodox church buildings
Buildings and structures in Banja Luka
16th-century establishments in Bosnia and Herzegovina
Christian monasteries established in the 16th century
Buildings and structures in Republika Srpska